Alma Har'el is an Israeli-American music video and film director. She is best known for her 2019 feature film debut Honey Boy, for which she won a Directors Guild of America Award.

Her 2011 documentary Bombay Beach, which took the top prize at Tribeca Film Festival, received a nomination for an Independent Spirit Award. In 2016, her documentary LoveTrue won the Grand Prix Best Documentary Award at the Karlovy Vary International Film Festival. The same year, Har'el was named one of the "Top 12 female filmmakers ready to direct a blockbuster" by IndieWire.

Har'el is noted for her ability to artistically blur the lines between documentary and fiction. Stephan Holden of The New York Times wrote about Har'el's film Bombay Beach: "[it] looks and feels like a fever dream about an alternate universe. Suffused with a sense of wonder, it hovers, dancing inside its own ethereal bubble".

Early life 
Har'el was born and raised in Tel Aviv, Israel, to a Jewish family, Alma Har'el began her work as a photographer and VJing at live music concerts.

One of Har'el's most prominent projects as a VJ was a collaboration with the Israeli music group Balkan Beat Box, including an 11-minute video, The Balkan Beat Box 1st show ever - Digital Diary of Alma Har'el, on their first album, released in 2005. Har'el later stated that she "never studied film, so that (VJing) was my film school" [ ... ] I wanted to feel as though I was playing videos like a musical instrument — editing them live, with people reacting. That still has a big impact on me to this day."

Career 
Working on live video-art performances with different musicians led Har'el to directing music videos, and her frequent collaborations with singer Zach Condon of the band Beirut brought her numerous awards and nominations in film and music video festivals.

Har'el's work on the Beirut music video for their single "Elephant Gun" (2009), earned her nominations for Best Directorial Debut at the MTV Video Music Awards and the Music Video Production Association Awards, and was number 30 on Paste Magazine's Top 50 Videos of the Decade.

In her 2012 music video for Icelandic band Sigur Rós' song "Fjögur píanó", from the album Valtari, Har'el directed Shia LaBeouf along with dancer Denna Thomsen. The video was part of the Valtari Mystery Film Experiment, in which Sigur Rós asked a dozen filmmakers to each select a song from the album and shoot a video inspired by the music. The Wall Street Journal explained that "All the directors received the same $10,000 budget and zero instructions from the band. With that creative freedom, filmmaker Alma Har'el delivered dead butterflies, light-up lollipops and a naked (in every sense) performance from a star of megabudget Hollywood movies." Har'el's video received over 4.7 million (as of July 2019) views on YouTube and critical acclaim.

LaBeouf, explaining his involvement in the project, stated that he wrote Har'el a fan letter after being deeply touched by Bombay Beach, to which Har'el responded that she would like to work with him. The two would collaborate again, with LaBeouf producing her 2016 documentary LoveTrue, and Har'el directing LaBeouf's 2019 autobiographical drama film Honey Boy (the latter of which being Har'el's narrative feature directorial debut).

In July 2011, Har'el was chosen as one of Filmmaker Magazine's 25 New Faces of Cinema, which also noted in October 2011 that her film Bombay Beach was "Stunningly shot and formally audacious, … (from) a major new directorial talent in Har'el who is working in a key all her own."

From 2014 to 2016, Har'el was the Global Creative Director at immersive media company RYOT.

Bombay Beach 
Bombay Beach is a 2011 feature film about the rusting relic of a failed 1950s development boom. The Salton Sea, a prominent character in the film, is a barren Californian landscape often seen as a symbol of the failure of the American Dream.

Har'el was joined by Zach Condon of the band Beirut, whom she worked with on music videos earlier in her career, to prepare the music for the film.

LoveTrue 
LoveTrue is a 2016 genre-bending documentary that brings Har'el's signature poetic imagery and fascination with performance in nonfiction to three complementary stories about love. The film had its world premiere at the 2016 Tribeca Film Festival, where its had multiple sold-out screenings and received positive reviews.

LoveTrue won best documentary feature at the 2016 Crested Butte Film Festival and the Grand Prix Best Documentary Award at the 2016 Karlovy Vary International Film Festival.[4]

Commercials 
Har'el has shot and directed commercials for tech companies, including Airbnb's first campaign, for which she won the 2014 Clio Award for Best Cinematography and the 2015 Wood Pencil Award for Best Cinematography.

Har'el also directed the first  ad campaign for Internet.org, Mark Zuckerberg's initiative to bring Internet access to technologically challenged areas of the world. Spots were shot in India, Indonesia and Bolivia, among other countries. She was also the first female filmmaker to direct a commercial for Stella Artois with 2016's ad "Isabella", which was shot by cinematographer Benoît Debie. In 2013 she joined commercial ad agency Epoch Films.

In 2017, Har'el directed a short film for Chanel called "Jellywolf" which stars Kiersey Clemons and Lisa Bonet. The 8-minute film is set in "a magical futuristic version of downtown LA brought to life with beguiling special effects". Clemons sets out on a journey to discover her mythical spirit animal "JellyWolf" with the help of Bonet's shamanic beauty parlor owner. Indiewire commented saying "Jellywolf" was "A wildly inventive short feminist sci-fi!"

Free the Bid 
In 2016, Har'el founded Free the Bid, an initiative designed to fight gender bias in the advertisement industry. It calls for ad agencies to include at least one female director every time they triple-bid a commercial production. The program also urges production companies to add more women to their rosters. If ad agencies can't find a woman candidate fit for the job, they must then pledge to free this bid by seeking other forms of diversity for the project. The initiative has garnered support by leading ad agencies around the world such as FCB, DDB, BBDO, McCann, JWT and Leo Burnett to hot shops like Pereira & O'Dell, Mother, 72&Sunny, Martin and 180, and in November 2016, Har'el received the "Female 3 Cheers Award" at the third annual 3% Movement Conference, a similar themed organization trying to expand the number of creative directors beyond 3%, for Free the Bid's impact on gender equality in advertising.

Honey Boy 
Har'el made her feature film directorial debut with Honey Boy (2019), written by and starring Shia LaBeouf in a semi-autobiographical story about his upbringing. In an interview with FF2 Media, Har'el cited the challenges of filming something so closely linked to PTSD as well as the captivating pull of the script that convinced her to take on the project. For her work on the film, Har'el won the Directors Guild of America Award for Outstanding Directing – First-Time Feature Film. In total, Honey Boy received 34 nominations and 9 wins from various associations and festivals. More recently, she signed a first look deal with Amazon Studios to develop TV projects.

Shadow Kingdom 
Har'el directed Shadow Kingdom: The Early Songs of Bob Dylan, a Bob Dylan concert film, which debuted on Veeps.com on July 18, 2021. The film earned rave reviews for its "stunning" visuals and Har'el referred to it as her "most cherished work" in an Instagram post six days after the premiere.

Personal life
She was married to American director of Israeli descent Boaz Yakin between the years of 2004-2012.

Music videos 

 Muki - "Won't Stop Dreaming" (2006)
 Taylor Hawkins and the Coattail Riders - "Louise" (2007)
 Beirut - "Elephant Gun" (2007)
 Beirut - "Postcards from Italy" (2008)
 Bajofondo - "Pa' Bailar" (2008)
 Nikka Costa - "Stuck to You" (2008)
 The Rolling Stones (Soulwax remix) - "You Can't Always Get What You Want" (2009)
 Jack Peñate - "Tonight's Today" (2009)
 Beirut - "Concubine" (2009)
 Fanfarlo - "Harold T. Wilkins" (2009)
 We Are The World - "Clay Stones" (2009)
 Shearwater - "Hidden Lakes" (2010)
 Sigur Rós - "Fjögur píanó" (2012)

Commercials (List) 
 Airbnb - "Birdhouses" (2013)
 Airbnb - "Views" (2013)
 Internet.org (2015)
 Stella Artois - "Isabella" (2016)

Awards and accolades 
 Best Debut Director (Nominated)- MTV Video Music Awards- Beirut "Elephant Gun" (2007)
 Best Indy Rock Video (Nominated)- UK Music Video Awards- Jack Penate "Tonight's Today" (2009)
 Best Music Video (Nominated)- Camerimage Film Festival- Jack Penate "Tonight's Today" (2009)
 Winner, Best World Documentary- Tribeca International Film Festival- Bombay Beach (2011)
 Nominated - Independent Spirit "Truer than Fiction" award – Bombay Beach (2011)
 Winner, Best Documentary - Guanajuato International Film Festival- Bombay Beach (2011)
 Winner - Best Editing - Woodstock Film Festival – Bombay Beach (2011)
 Honorable Mention, Special Jury Award- Sheffield Doc Fest- Bombay Beach (2011)
 Winner - Emerging Cinematic Vision - Camden International Film Festival – Bombay Beach (2011)
 Filmmaker Magazine's 25 New Faces of Cinema (2011)
 Nominated - Cinema Eye Honors "Best Film Debut" and "Best Cinematography"– Bombay Beach (2012)
 "The 20 Best Uses of Bob Dylan Songs In Film" by Paste Magazine." (2012)
 Winner, Best Cinematography - Clio Awards - Airbnb "Views" (2014)
 Winner, Best Cinematography - Wood Pencil - Airbnb "Views" (2015)
 Winner, Best Documentary Feature - Crested Butte Film Festival - "LoveTrue" (2016)
 Winner, Best Documentary - Karlovy Vary International Festival - "LoveTrue" (2016)
 Top 12 Female Filmmakers Ready to Direct a Blockbuster - Indiewire (2016)

References

External links 

 
 

Living people
Israeli Jews
Israeli women film directors
Israeli documentary film directors
Israeli expatriates in the United States
Female music video directors
Israeli people of Polish-Jewish descent
American people of Israeli descent
People from Tel Aviv
Women documentary filmmakers
1976 births
Sundance Film Festival award winners
Jewish film people